Kolonga is a rural locality in the Bundaberg Region, Queensland, Australia.

Geography 
The east of Kolonga is bounded by Lake Monduran, the impoundment of the Fred Haigh Dam.

The Bruce Highway passes through the locality from Takilberan in the south to Lowmead to the north. Shortly after the highway enters from the south, Kalpowar Road branches off to Gaeta in the west.

The land use is grazing on native vegetation.

History 
The locality name takes its name from the parish name which in turn is named after the Kolonga pastoral run named in the early 1860s. Kolonga is probably from the Kabi language word, kalanga meaning very good.

Kolonga Provisional School opened circa 1886 and closed circa 1887. Kolonga Provisional School opened 1911 and closed in 1924. It is not clear if these were the same school or two separate schools.

In 1887,  of land were resumed from the Kolonga pastoral run. The land was offered for selection for the establishment of small farms on 17 April 1887.

Education 
There are no schools in Kolonga. The nearest primary schools are in Gin Gin and Lowmead. The nearest secondary schools are in Gin Gin and Rosedale.

References 

Bundaberg Region
Localities in Queensland